Slieve na Calliagh are a range of hills and ancient burial site near Oldcastle, County Meath, Ireland. On the hilltops are about twenty passage tombs, some decorated with rare megalithic art, which were built in the 4th millennium BC. Also called the Loughcrew tombs, it is one of the main passage tomb cemeteries in Ireland, along with Brú na Bóinne, Carrowkeel and Carrowmore.

Naming
The hills are named after the Cailleach, the divine hag of Irish mythology. Legend has it that the monuments were created when a giant hag, striding across the land, dropped her cargo of large stones from her apron.

Geography
Slieve na Calliagh includes the hills of Carnbane West, Carrickbrack, Carnbane East, and Patrickstown Hill.

Tombs

On the hilltops are the remains of megalithic tombs dating back to the 4th millennium BC. These tombs are also known as Slieve na Calliagh, or the Loughcrew tombs. These tombs were described by the archaeologist E.A. Conwell in 1864 when he presented a paper to the Royal Irish Academy. Conwel's surveys and investigations were followed by those of Rotherham in 1895, and George Coffey at the start of the 20th century. The cairns are likely predate the ones at Brú na Bóinne and much of their art anticipates similar forms used later at sites in the valley of the Boyne. The cairns are passage graves which date from around 3,000 BC and research on human remains found in association with similar monuments elsewhere in Ireland suggests that the builders were the descendants of people who settled in Ireland from modern Brittany around 4,200 BC. The two main cairns on the site are tumuli known as Cairn L and Cairn T, Cairn T is also called  Tomb of the Ollamh Fodhla or the Hag's Cairn, and so far more than 30 existing archaeological sites have been identified and there may once have been between fifty and one hundred mounds in the area. Within Cairn T is a carved stone, called the Equinox Stone, which is illuminated by the sun at the dawn of the Spring equinox, above this stone is a decorated ceiling stone which is also illuminated by the sun during the sunrise at the Spring equinox.

See also 
Brain balls - found within some of the dolmens in the area
Cailleach
Lists of mountains in Ireland
List of Irish counties by highest point
List of mountains of the British Isles by height
List of Marilyns in the British Isles

References

External links
 Megalithic Cairns at Slieve na Calliagh - photos and videos from Knowth.com

Marilyns of Ireland
Mountains and hills of County Meath
Highest points of Irish counties
Archaeological sites in County Meath
National Monuments in County Meath